Teimuraz Kakulia (26 April 1947, Tbilisi, Georgian SSR — 25 August 2006, Tbilisi, Georgia) was a Soviet tennis player and Soviet/Georgian tennis coach.

Tennis career
Teimuraz Kakulia started playing tennis at the age of 11. For the most part of his tennis career, he remained in the shadow of his colleague and friend Alex Metreveli, losing to him five times in the singles finals of the USSR tennis championships. Together they took five men's doubles titles at the Soviet championships, and Kakulia  won the tournament once with Marina Chuvyrina in mixed doubles.

Other highlights of Kakulia's career were winning bronze medals in the mixed doubles exhibition event at the 1968 Olympic Games at the age of 21; winning the tennis tournament at the 1973 Summer Universiade in singles, men's doubles and mixed doubles; and reaching 1972 Australian Open semifinals in men's doubles (with Metreveli). In singles, his best achievements were reaching the fourth round at the 1976 US Open as well as victories over Eddie Dibbs and Mark Edmondson. He also won the Wimbledon Plate.

In addition, Kakulia has played an integral part in the Soviet Davis Cup team victories at the Europe Zone in 1974 and 1976 after which the team advanced to the Inter-Zonal stage. As a team member, Kakulia was also a four-time European amateur champion.

In 1977, Teimuraz Kakulia was awarded the Distinguished Master of Sport of the USSR rank, the highest in the Soviet sports classification. He was only the second Soviet tennis player to join WCT, with Metreveli's being the first.

After finishing his active playing career, Kakulia focused on coaching. He was a member of the Soviet national team coaching group. Leila Meskhi, bronze medalist at the 1992 Olympics, was the most successful among his trainees. During the last 10 years of his life, illness prevented from coaching.

Grand Slam singles performance timeline

References

External links 
 
 
 
 

1947 births
2006 deaths
Male tennis players from Georgia (country)
Sportspeople from Tbilisi
Soviet male tennis players
Tennis coaches from Georgia (country)
Tennis players at the 1968 Summer Olympics
Universiade medalists in tennis
Universiade gold medalists for the Soviet Union
Medalists at the 1973 Summer Universiade